Dawn to Dusk may refer to:

 Dawn to Dusk, the first disc of the album Mellon Collie and the Infinite Sadness by The Smashing Pumpkins
 "Dawn to Dusk", a song from the Raga soundtrack
 Dawn-to-dusk transcontinental flight across the United States, an aviation record established in 1924

See also
 From Dusk till Dawn (disambiguation)
 Dusk Till Dawn (disambiguation)